Alan James Muir (born 10 May 1975) is a Scottish football referee.

References

External links
 

1975 births
Living people
Scottish football referees
Place of birth missing (living people)
Scottish Football League referees
Scottish Premier League referees
Scottish Professional Football League referees